The Jackie Robinson Ballpark (also known as Jackie Robinson Stadium or City Island Ball Park) is a historic baseball field in Daytona Beach, Florida, United States. It is located at 105 East Orange Avenue on City Island, in the Halifax River.

Overview 
The ballpark, originally known as City Island Ball Park, opened in 1914. It consisted of a baseball field and a set of wooden bleachers. The present day grandstand and press box were built in 1962. It is the home of the Daytona Tortugas and the Bethune–Cookman Wildcats. The Daytona Tortugas were founded in 1993. They have won six Florida State League championships, 1994, 2000, 2004, 2008, 2011, and 2013.

The Bethune–Cookman Wildcats have also achieved recent success, including six consecutive Mid-Eastern Athletic Conference (MEAC) baseball championships from 1999 to 2004, and seven more in 2006–2012.

History

Baseball
Daytona Beach and the stadium were the first Florida city to allow Robinson to play during the 1946 season's spring training. Robinson had been signed to play for the Triple-A Montreal Royals who held spring training in Florida with Brooklyn Dodgers. Both Jacksonville and Sanford locked their stadiums to the Royals and forced the cancellation of scheduled exhibition games due to local ordinances which prohibited "mixed" athletics.

Daytona Beach permitted the game, which was played on March 17, 1946. This contributed to Robinson breaking Major League Baseball's color barrier the following year when he joined the Dodgers. The refusal by Jacksonville, previously the Dodgers' spring training home, led the team to host spring training in Daytona in 1947 and build Dodgertown in Vero Beach for the 1948 season. A statue of Robinson is now located at the south entrance to the ballpark.

The ballpark was previously the home field of the Daytona Beach Islanders (1920–1924, 1936–1941, 1946–1966, 1977, 1985–1986), Daytona Beach Dodgers (1968–1973), and Daytona Beach Astros (1978–1984). The major league Montreal Expos conducted their spring training at the park from 1973 to 1980.

As of the 2021 season, Jackie Robinson Ballpark is the oldest active ballpark in Minor League Baseball.

Outside of baseball
The stadium sustained heavy damage during Hurricane Donna in 1960. A $2 million historic renovation project was accelerated after Hurricane Floyd ripped off the metal roofs over the seating in 1999. In 2004, the ballpark suffered moderate damage during Hurricane Charley, causing several home games to be moved to Melching Field at Conrad Park in nearby DeLand.

On October 22, 1998, the stadium was added to the United States National Register of Historic Places. This property is part of the Daytona Beach Multiple Property Submission, a Multiple Property Submission to the National Register.

On May 12, 2018, the stadium hosted a concert by rapper Nelly with Bone Thugs-n-Harmony and Juvenile as the opening acts.

See also 
 List of NCAA Division I baseball venues

References

External links 
 Jackie Robinson Ballpark from the Daytona Tortugas website
 Florida's Office of Cultural and Historical Programs
 Jackie Robinson Ball Park
 Famous Floridians of Daytona Beach
 Jackie Robinson Ballpark Views – Ball Parks of the Minor Leagues

Baltimore Orioles spring training venues
Brooklyn Dodgers spring training venues
Grapefruit League venues
Minor league baseball venues
Montreal Expos spring training venues
National Register of Historic Places in Volusia County, Florida
Spring training ballparks
St. Louis Cardinals spring training venues
Baseball venues in Florida
Bethune–Cookman Wildcats baseball
Jackie Robinson
Sports venues in Volusia County, Florida
Buildings and structures in Daytona Beach, Florida
Sports in Daytona Beach, Florida
1914 establishments in Florida
Sports venues completed in 1914
Sports venues on the National Register of Historic Places in Florida
College baseball venues in the United States
Florida State League ballparks